Harrington railway station is a railway station serving the village of Harrington in Cumbria, England. It is owned by Network Rail and managed by Northern Trains.

Harrington Hump
The station came to national prominence in 2008 when it was chosen as the initial site for the installation of an experimental ramp to raise the height of the platform to improve access to modern rolling stock.  Christened the Harrington Hump, the ramp was built for £25,000 – 10% of the estimated cost of the conventional rebuilding that would have otherwise been required to make the platform fully DDA compliant.  The modular design has since been deployed at several other rural stations across the UK where the cost of platform upgrades would otherwise have been considered prohibitive.

Facilities
The station is unstaffed (like most others on the route), but now has been provided with a ticket machine to allow passengers to buy tickets before travelling.  Shelters are located on both platforms, which are linked by a footbridge.  Step-free access is available only on the southbound side (where the main entrance is situated). Train running information is provided via telephone, digital information screens and timetable posters.

Service

There is generally an hourly service northbound to Carlisle and southbound to Whitehaven with most trains going onward to Barrow-in-Furness (no late evening service operates south of Whitehaven). A few through trains operate to/from Lancaster via the Furness Line.

Train operator Northern introduced a regular Sunday through service to Barrow via the coast at the May 2018 timetable change – the first such service south of Whitehaven for more than 40 years.  Services run approximately hourly from mid-morning until early evening, with later trains terminating at Whitehaven.  This represents a major upgrade on the former infrequent service of four per day each way to/from Whitehaven only that previously operated. In addition, it was announced that Harrington would no longer be a request stop.

References

External links

 
 

Railway stations in Cumbria
DfT Category F2 stations
Former London and North Western Railway stations
Railway stations in Great Britain opened in 1846
Northern franchise railway stations
1846 establishments in England